KAMP (1430 kHz) – branded as 1430 AM The Bet – is a commercial sports AM radio station licensed to Aurora, Colorado, and serving the Denver metropolitan area. Owned by Audacy, Inc., the station's format focuses on sports betting, and is the market affiliate for CBS Sports Radio and the BetQL Network. The KAMP studios located in the Denver Tech Center, while the transmitter is located in nearby Highlands Ranch, near Colorado State Highway 470.

History
In 1954, the station signed on as KOSI. The station was purchased by Bill Armstrong in 1959. In 1968, sister station KOSI-FM was launched on 101.1 FM. The two stations were successful in the Denver radio market, carrying a beautiful music format.

In 1981, KOSI became KEZW, and adopted an adult standards format, which would last for the next three decades. On December 27, 2015, KEZW adopted the oldies format from sister station KRWZ, which was sold to Kroenke Sports and Entertainment and flipped to sports as KKSE.

On September 4, 2018, KEZW changed its format to a hybrid of soft oldies and adult standards, branded as "EZ 1430".

On January 25, 2021, KEZW flipped to a gambling-focused sports talk format as "1430 AM The Bet". The change was done as part of the launch of Entercom's new BetQL Audio Network that day, KEZW's main source of gambling programming. As the first station on the network, KEZW was the de facto flagship station of the network. KEZW's line-up included “BetQL Daily” from 8am-11am and “You Better You Bet” from 2-6pm daily. The remainder of the programming lineup came from CBS Sports Radio.

On April 22, 2021, KEZW changed call letters to KAMP, as part of a warehousing move due to a change of call letters at sister station KAMP-FM in Los Angeles.

References

External links

AMP
Mass media in Aurora, Colorado
Audacy, Inc. radio stations
Sports radio stations in the United States
CBS Sports Radio stations
Radio stations established in 1954
1954 establishments in Colorado